HMCS Mayflower was a  that served mainly in the Royal Canadian Navy during the Second World War but began her service with the Royal Navy. She saw action primarily in the Battle of the Atlantic as an ocean escort. She was named after the flowering plant Maianthemum canadense.

Background

Flower-class corvettes like Mayflower serving with the Royal Canadian Navy during the Second World War were different from earlier and more traditional sail-driven corvettes.  The "corvette" designation was created by the French as a class of small warships; the Royal Navy borrowed the term for a period but discontinued its use in 1877. During the hurried preparations for war in the late 1930s, Winston Churchill reactivated the corvette class, needing a name for smaller ships used in an escort capacity, in this case based on a whaling ship design. The generic name "flower" was used to designate the class of these ships, which – in the Royal Navy – were named after flowering plants.

Construction
Mayflower was ordered 20 January 1940 for the Royal Navy as part of the 1939-1940 Flower-class building program. She was laid down on 20 February 1940 by Canadian Vickers Ltd. at Montreal and was launched on 3 July 1940. She was commissioned on 28 November 1940 and sailed to the United Kingdom in February 1941 for completion on the Tyne River in May. On 15 May 1941 Mayflower was one of ten corvettes loaned to Canada. She could be told apart from other Canadian Flowers by her lack of minesweeping gear and the siting of the after gun tub amidships.

During her career, Mayflower had three significant refits. The first took place at Charleston, South Carolina from 9 December 1941 until February 1942. Her second major refit took place from 29 October 1942 until 11 January 1943 at Pictou, Nova Scotia. Mayflowers final refit was done at Norfolk, Virginia from 29 November 1943 to 14 February 1944. During this refit, she had her fo'c'sle extended.

War service

Royal Navy
After workups, Mayflower had a brief period under Royal Navy command. She was assigned to escort group EG 4 before being transferred to the Royal Canadian Navy.

Royal Canadian Navy
After her transferral, Mayflower was assigned to Newfoundland Command in June 1941. With this force, she escorted convoys from St. John's to Iceland for the rest of the year with escort groups 19N and N16. In her first month with the group, she was escorting convoy SC 44 when one of the other escorts,  was torpedoed. Mayflower evacuated all non-essential personnel from the derelict ship except for the damage-control party.

After returning from refit in early 1942, she was deployed as an ocean escort under Mid-Ocean Escort Force (MOEF) command on convoys between St. John's and Derry. She continued performing this duty until April 1944. Mayflower was initially assigned to escort group A-3 in April 1942, but was transferred to C-3 in February 1943.

In April 1944 she was assigned to Western Approaches Command to take part in Operation Neptune, the naval aspect of the invasion of Normandy. On 31 May 1944, she set out to escort the blockships from Oban, which would become part of the beachhead after D-day. After the invasion, Mayflower spent the rest of the war in the waters around the United Kingdom. She was returned to the Royal Navy 31 May 1945.

Trans-Atlantic convoys escorted

Post-war service
After her return to the Royal Navy, Mayflower was laid up at Grangemouth. She was sold for scrapping on 20 September 1949 and broken up at Inverkeithing.

References

 

Flower-class corvettes of the Royal Canadian Navy
Flower-class corvettes of the Royal Navy
1940 ships